Andrew Mangham (born 1979) is a literary critic and professor at the University of Reading, UK. He is best known for his work on Victorian literature and is the author of We Are All Monsters: How Deviant Organisms Came to Define Us (2023), The Science of Starving (2020), Dickens's Forensic Realism (2017) and Violent Women and Sensation Fiction (2007). Mangham was born in Thurnscoe, a coal-mining village near Barnsley, South Yorkshire.

References

Living people
People from Thurnscoe
1979 births
British literary critics
21st-century British writers
Alumni of the University of Huddersfield
Alumni of the University of Leeds
Alumni of the University of Sheffield